Jean-Jacques Reboux (29 October 1958 – 13 July 2021) was a French writer, poet, and editor.

Biography

Early life
Born in Madré in 1958, Reboux held several careers in his early life, including work as a schoolteacher and cinema manager. Before his career as an editor, he was also a poet, writing the collection La Foire à bras.

Editor and writer
In 1992, Reboux founded Éditions Canaille in order to publish his books, which were refused by other publishers, including Pain perdu chez les vilains and Fondu au noir. In 1995, his company was bought by Éditions Baleine, and Reboux became director of the Canaille/Revolver collection. He published the first three books by Yasmina Khadra. Following the publication of Le massacre des innocents, he became a highly touted writer. He then wrote three books in the  collection: La cerise sur le gâteux in 1996, Parkinson le glas in 2002, and Castro c'est trop ! in 2004.

Specializing in soap opera books, he started the series Les aventures extraordinaires de Moulard in 2000. The first book in the series was titled Pour l'amour de Pénélope.

Engaged editor
In 2006, Reboux began a tighter focus on editing with the foundation of Éditions Après la Lune alongside Christine Beigel and Yasmina Khadra. The Catholic society sought €30,000 in damages, but the case was eventually dismissed. In 2011, Fradier sued the publishing house again over a minor dispute, but Reboux was supported by dozens of writers and editors.

Fernand Buron controversy
In 2008, Reboux attended the Paris International Agricultural Show, where he refused to shake the hand of President Nicolas Sarkozy. In the incident, which was filmed by a reporter from Le Parisien, Reboux said "Ah no, don't touch me!", to which Sarkozy replied, "Get lost, then". Reboux then replied "You're making me dirty". In a controversial move, Sarkozy retorted ""Get lost, then, poor dumb-ass, go." (Casse-toi pov'con!), which inspired the 2011 book Casse-toi pov'con ! by Fernand Buron. The case could have led to his arrest, but was dismissed by the public prosecutor. On 28 January 2010, Sarkozy's birthday, Reboux held a sign that read "Casse-toi pov'con!" in front of the Élysée Palace.

Political engagement
Although he claimed not to be a political activist, Reboux was a committed left-winger and sympathized with the anarchist movement. However, he claimed that his only act of "militancy" was the sponsorship of an undocumented Moroccan during the time of the Debré laws. In 2008, he met with Romain Durand, an activist within  and the Confédération nationale du travail, and the pair wrote Lettre au garde des sceaux pour la dépénalisation du délit d'outrage.

From 2008 to 2010, Reboux published several articles on the website Rue89 under the pseudonym "outrageur de poulets" (outrageous chickens) with offensive outrage. In 2013, he posted a blog on his quarrels with Algerian writer Yasmina Khadra, who was becoming increasingly controversial in the Algerian community, titled Comment je me suis fait entuber par Yasmina Khadra. On 23 October 2014, he covered the trial of Henri Guaino for L'Humanité.

Death
Jean-Jacques Reboux died on 13 July 2021, at the age of 62.

Works

Essays
Lettre ouverte à Nicolas Sarkozy, ministre des libertés policières (2006)
Chômeurs, qu'attendez-vous pour disparaître ? (2007)
Lettre au garde des Sceaux pour une dépénalisation du délit d'outrage (2008)
Casse-toi pov'con ! (2010)

News
Le Nonos de canard, in Noces de canailles (1994)
Urubu roi (1996)
Dissous, ris et dégomme, in L'évènement du Jeudi (1998)
Ben Laden a tué Mamie Dupré, in 36 nouvelles noires pour l'Humanité (2004)
T'as de la chance qu'il soit pas président ! (2007)
Donnez-moi un mouchoir, je vais me reposer (2013)
C'est sans danger (2014)

Poetry
Le Matin majuscule (1978)
Fleuve rouge (1983)
Le bout du gras (1984)

Novels
Pain perdu chez les vilains (1992)
Mr. Smith n'aime pas les asperges (1993)
Fondu au noir (1995)
Le massacre des innocents (1995)
La cerise sur le gâteux (1996)
Poste mortem (1998)
Pour l'amour de Pénélope (2000)
Le paradis des pickpockets (2000)
C'est à cause des poules (2000)
Le voyage de monsieur Victor (2001)
Méfiez-vous des asperges ! (2001)
Pourquoi j' ai tué Laetitia Remington (2001)
Parkinson le glas (2002)
Castro c'est trop ! (2004)
Au bonheur des poules ! (2006)
De Gaulle, Van Gogh, ma femme et moi (2006)
Je suis partout (les derniers jours de Nicolas Sarkozy) (2010)
L'esprit Bénuchot (2016)

Youth novels
Le diable dans le rétroviseur (2016)

References

1958 births
2021 deaths
French writers
French novelists
French socialists
People from Mayenne